= DirecTV 500 =

At one time, two different NASCAR races were known as the DirecTV 500:

- For the spring race at Martinsville Speedway in 2006, see STP 500
- For the spring race at Texas Motor Speedway in 2000, see O'Reilly Auto Parts 500
